Alan "Al" Stewart (born 1959) was an assistant bishop in the Anglican Diocese of Sydney and oversaw the diocese's Wollongong region from 2007 until 2010.

Stewart was educated at Moore Theological College and served parishes in Tregear, New South Wales and Centennial Park. His last position before his ordination to the episcopate was as the CEO of Anglican Youthworks.

In 2009, Stewart was appointed to the Evangelism Ministries in the Diocese of Sydney. In January 2015 Stewart was appointed Sydney director for the City Bible Forum.

In March 2020, Stewart was appointed as National Director of the Fellowship of Independent Evangelical Churches.

References

1959 births
Moore Theological College alumni
21st-century Anglican bishops in Australia
Assistant bishops in the Anglican Diocese of Sydney
Living people